Battleship Bismarck: Operation Rhine - May 1941 is a 1987 video game published by General Quarters Software.

Gameplay
Battleship Bismarck is a game in which the German player is Admiral Lutjens attempting to raid commercial vessels in the Atlantic and the British player is Admiral Tovey attempting to sink the German raider.

Reception
Wyatt Lee reviewed the game for Computer Gaming World, and compared it to Action in the North Atlantic and stated that "players who like one of these games will definitely like the other."

References

1987 video games
Apple II games
Battle of the Atlantic
Computer wargames
DOS games
Naval video games
Turn-based strategy video games
Video games about Nazi Germany
Video games developed in the United States
World War II video games